The Columbia Police Department (CPD) is the principal law enforcement agency serving the city of Columbia, Missouri in the United States. It protects a metropolitan population of nearly 127,000 with 187 sworn police officers.

Bureaus

The Columbia Police Department is made up of four Bureaus. The Administrative Bureau, headed by the Chief of Police and the Administrative Support, Operations and Operations Support Bureaus, each led by Assistant Chiefs.

Administrative Bureau
The Administrative Bureau is the smallest of the four bureaus and contains the Office of the Chief of Police, Deputy Chief of Police, the Armory, Public Relations Unit, Accreditation Manager, Neighborhood Services Officer, the Budget and Financial Management Specialist, and the Legal Advisor.

The Chief oversees the Deputy Chief and the Public Relations Unit as well as working with the Legal Advisor. The Public Relations Unit includes the Neighborhood Services Officer.

The Deputy Chief is responsible for the Accreditation Manager, the Budget and Financial Management Specialist, and the three bureau commanders.

Administrative Support Bureau
The Administrative Support Bureau includes the Internal Affairs Unit, Training and Recruitment Unit and Records Unit, as well as the Building and Vehicle (fleet) maintenance personnel. In addition, The SWAT and Crisis Negotiation Team (CNT) fall under this bureau as well.

Internal Affairs Unit
The Internal Affairs Unit consists of a sergeant and an officer who are responsible for the daily functions of the unit.  These individuals have investigative experience and have received specialized training in the area of internal affairs investigations.

The Internal Affairs Unit became operational in February 2008 as a result of the department's desire to bring internal investigations and employee recognition to current national standards.  The members of the P.S.U. provide a transparent investigative function for those incidences which result in compliments or complaints about actions of department employees, and monitor and administrate the Employee Recognition, Mandatory Review and Early Intervention programs in a manner that is fair to all parties involved.

Training and Recruitment Unit
The Training and Recruitment Unit (TRU), in conjunction with the Columbia City Human Resources Department, is responsible for all new hires to the CPD. The TRU also supervises all department instructors and ensures that all department in-service training adheres to Missouri POST standards. The unit also supervises the Field Training program which is responsible for recruit officer training. The TRU is headquartered at the Columbia Police Regional Training Center located just south of the city along US Highway 63.

Records Unit
The Records Unit is made up of civilian staff who are responsible for filling police criminal, arrest, incident and accident reports with local courts as needed and maintaining all police reports for statistical purposes. In addition, the Records Unit is responsible for filing Uniform Crime Report (UCR) data to the FBI each year, and handling open records or "Sunshine" records requests from citizens, media and interested organizations.

Operations Bureau
The Operations Bureau is composed of the Patrol Division, Downtown Unit, K-9 Unit and the Community Service Aides. The Operations Bureau is the largest and most visible part of the department and is responsible for providing the primary response to citizen's calls for service. Uniformed officers in this Division enforce state statutes, local ordinances and traffic laws, as well as many other activities.

The City of Columbia is divided into three sectors (North, Central & South) and is patrolled by approximately 70 officers assigned to four shifts. The Patrol Division is commanded by a captain, who is assisted by three Patrol Lieutenants that serve at shift commanders. Each of the four shifts are under direct supervision of sergeants. Two Canine Teams are also assigned to the Patrol Division and aid the officers in drug searches, tracks for individuals and property, and protection.

In 2007, units on patrol responded to 142,002 total incidents; of these incidents 12,483 criminal investigations were made and 8,362 individuals were arrested.

In May 2009, the CPD formed a special downtown patrol unit due to increased criminal activity in the Downtown and Columbia Mall areas. Using Ash Street, Providence Road, Elm Street and Waugh Street as borders, the new unit will take a strong stance on aggressive panhandling, graffiti, liquor law violations and exceeding occupancy limits at bars and restaurants, in order to prevent these activities from becoming a problem and requiring a larger police presence. The Downtown Unit is staffed by five officers and led by a sergeant.

Community Service Aides (CSA's) are non-sworn civilian personnel who assist patrol and other divisions by responding to minor accidents and conducting traffic control. In addition, CSA's serve as station masters in the main lobby and assist citizens walking in off the street in need of various police services such as applicant fingerprinting.

Operations Support Bureau
The Operations Support Bureau is made up of the Criminal Investigations Division, Vice Narcotics & Organized Crime Unit, Traffic Unit and the Evidence Unit.

The Criminal Investigation Division (CID) is led by two sergeants and headed by a lieutenant and is made up of detectives who are assigned to investigate major crimes against persons (homicide, robbery, sexual assault, missing persons, aggravated assault, and child and elderly abuse) along with major felony property crimes (burglary, theft, fraud, forgery, embezzlement, arson, vehicle thefts, credit card crimes and computer crimes). In addition, CID has two specialized units that conduct investigations involving juveniles and Domestic Violence (DOVE).

The CID is also responsible for investigating fires within the City of Columbia. Investigators are responsible for making on-the-scene assessments as to the origin and cause of the fire and providing investigative assistance to the Columbia Fire Department. The unit works in conjunction with pawnshops and secondhand dealers in the recovery of victims' property and the identification of suspects dealing with stolen property.

The CID also oversees the department's Forensic Evidence Team. The Forensic Evidence Team is responsible for assisting both the Patrol Division and CID with the collection and preservation of evidence from crime scenes. The Forensic Evidence Team is made up of volunteer members who receive specialized training in evidence collection. The team members are regular officers serving in other capacities within the department who can be called upon for evidence collection during major incidents.

DOVE Unit
The Domestic Violence Enforcement Unit (DOVE) began operating at the Columbia Police Department on February 2, 1998. The DOVE Unit was formed and funded through the STOP Violence Against Women Grant and is a specialized unit composed of three investigators, a victim advocate, and two assistant prosecuting attorneys. The unit is composed of detectives from the Columbia Police Department and the Boone County Sheriff's Department. The unit's mission is to decrease the level of domestic violence by investigating domestic violence cases, promoting deterrence of violence, assisting victims, and interrupting the cycle of violence.

To accomplish its mission, the DOVE Unit investigates domestic violence incidents in Columbia and Boone County, assists the prosecuting attorney's office in prosecuting the offenders, aids victims in obtaining restraining orders, and assists with the arrest of offenders based on active warrants. The DOVE Unit also assists victims, coordinates with other agencies, trains officers in and around Boone County, and promotes community education. The intended result of these activities is to deter and hold offenders accountable, empower victims, and enhance domestic violence reporting and enforcement.

Vice Narcotics & Organized Crime Unit
The Vice Narcotics & Organized Crime Unit, or VNOC, is composed of plain clothes detectives and the uniformed personnel of the Street Crimes Unit. The Narcotics Unit is composed of detectives assigned to investigate activity involving the illegal selling, buying and possession of dangerous drugs and narcotics. Detectives assigned to the Narcotics Unit receive extensive training in the area of narcotics investigation and utilize various investigative techniques and methods including surveillance, undercover buys, search warrants, and use of confidential informants.  Detectives present cases to the Boone County Prosecutor's Office as well as the United States Attorney's Office.

Street Crimes Unit
Formed in 2008 after an increase in violent crime, the Street Crimes Unit is composed of four officers supervised by a sergeant. This unit seeks to arrest career criminals and patrol crime "hot spots" within Columbia. Other duties include combating street level “open air” drug dealing, assisting Major Crimes Unit in locating and apprehending felony suspects, identifying and arresting individuals who are engaged in criminal gang activity, and traffic enforcement in high crime areas. The street crimes division do not wear the same uniform as the regular patrol officer. Street Crimes wear more tactical uniform instead of the regular patrol uniform. They include subdued department shoulder patches and a "Street Crimes" Patch across the back.

Traffic Unit

The Traffic Unit is composed of accident investigators, motorcycle officers and the DWI Enforcement Unit. All members of the Traffic Unit conduct target traffic enforcement throughout the city and in direct response to citizen traffic complaints. Additionally, the traffic unit assists with major community events for traffic control and street closure purposes. These events include parades, dignitary visits, downtown festivals, funeral escorts and University of Missouri Football games.

The DWI Unit consists of two officers who specialize in the detection of impaired drivers. The units two Chevrolet Tahoes are each equipped with Alco-Sensor IV breath test instruments, which allow them to conduct a complete DWI investigation right at the site of the traffic stop or motor vehicle crash. DWI Unit members are also state certified Drug Recognition Experts, allowing them to detect drivers who are impaired by substances other than alcohol.

Evidence Unit
The Evidence Unit is composed of civilian personnel supervised by a CPD Sergeant. The unit is responsible for the preservation and storage of physical evidence recovered by officers and detectives during their investigations. Members of the unit also transport various items of evidence to and from the Missouri State Highway Patrol Crime Lab in Jefferson City for testing and analysis.

Special teams

SWAT
Formerly known as the Special Tactics and Response Team (STAR), the Columbia SWAT Team was created in 1976 after a need was determined for a specialized team trained in tactics beyond ordinary police response. The SWAT Team is divided into three sub-units: Arrest Team, Rescue Team and Sniper Team.

Within the inner perimeter of an incident, the Arrest Team serves to accept the surrender of a suspect or released hostage. They will also affect emergency rescues should the situation deteriorate before negotiations begin or a deliberate tactical plan can be enacted. The Rescue Team is responsible for planning and executing a tactical plan to resolve crisis situations should negotiations with Crisis Negotiators fail. The Rescue Team also engages in the tactical deployment of throw phones for negotiation purposes and the deployment of chemical agent munitions. The Sniper Team is responsible for observation of the scene as well as intelligence gathering which is relayed to tactical commanders and the rest of the team. The Sniper Team is also capable of precision incapacitation should a deadly threat be presented.

The SWAT Team is tasked with responding to the following types of incidents:
Hostage Rescue
Barricaded Subjects
High Risk Warrant Service
VIP & visiting dignitary protection

Neighborhood Response Team
The Neighborhood Response Team (N.R.T.) was created in 1999 to attempt to correct concerns residents in the central city had/have. These concerns of residents in the area include illegal drug activity, trash, abandoned vehicles and dilapidated housing. Citations are issued for conditions that are observed to not be up to city code (roof deterioration, peeling paint, debris on property, etc.) and the N.R.T. is tasked with following up on those citations.

Members of the N.R.T. include the following city agencies: the Environmental Health division of the Health Department, the Protective Inspection division of the Public Works Department, the Police Department and the Department of Public Communications.

Crisis Negotiation Team
Created in 1976, the Crisis Negotiation Team, originally called the Hostage Negotiation Team, is tasked with responding to hostage or emotionally distressed subject events.

Fifteen officers are currently assigned to the Crisis Negotiation Team. A Captain commands the team with the support of two sergeants; during an incident one sergeant supervises any negotiations, while the other is in change of obtaining intelligence. The remainder of the team is made up of two equipment technicians and ten negotiators. The larger team size allows for the team to split into two separate teams should two different incidents occur. It also allows for continual relief should a negotiation become extended for several hours or days. To date, the longest C.N.T. negotiation was twelve hours.

All negotiators undergo the basic crisis negotiation course from Northwestern University in Illinois, as well as an advanced crisis negotiation course after two years of experience. Commanders undergo the Critical Incident Commander's course from Northwestern. Members also undergo additional training put on by various Federal agencies. Bimonthly training consists of practicing negotiation skills in front of other team members; additionally, every year the C.N.T. and SWAT teams train together in simulated exercises.

Additional duties performed by the C.N.T. are: protecting VIPs, assisting with mass arrests, and supporting SWAT in serving high risk warrants.

In the news
On July 7, 2009, the Columbia City Council voted to create a Police Review Board. The nine-member board, chosen by the City Council, will focus on complaints brought forward by both the general public and law enforcement officers and will be staffed by Columbia residents.

In January 2019, Officer Andria Hesse struck and killed a child while driving on a sidewalk near an elementary school. First charged with involuntary manslaughter, she pleaded guilty to  careless and imprudent driving. In July 2021, she was sentenced to two years of supervised probation.

See also
University of Missouri Police Department
Boone County Sheriff's Department

References

External links
Columbia Police Department official website

Emergency services of Boone County, Missouri
Municipal police departments of Missouri
Government of Columbia, Missouri